"Gay agenda" or "homosexual agenda" is a term used by sectors of the Christian religious right as a disparaging way to describe the advocacy of cultural acceptance and normalization of non-heterosexual sexual orientations and relationships. The term originated among social conservatives in the United States and has been adopted in other nations with active anti-LGBT movements such as Hungary and Uganda.

The term refers to efforts to change government policies and laws on LGBT rights–related issues. Additionally, it has been used by social conservatives and others to describe alleged goals of LGBT rights activists, such as recruiting heterosexuals into what conservatives term a "homosexual lifestyle".

Origins and usage

Origins

In the United States, the phrase "gay agenda" was popularized by a video series produced by a California evangelical religious group called Springs of Life Ministries. The first video of the series, The Gay Agenda, was released in 1992 and distributed to hundreds of Christian right organizations. 
Tens of thousands of copies of the video were sold, it was distributed to the United States Congress, and Commandant of the Marine Corps Carl Mundy Jr. gave it to the other members of the Joint Chiefs of Staff. 

In 1992, the Oregon Citizens Alliance (OCA), a conservative Christian activist organization, used The Gay Agenda as part of their campaign for Oregon Ballot Measure 9, opposing what the OCA called "special rights" for gays, lesbians, and bisexuals.
The Gay Agenda was followed by three other video productions made available through Christian right organizations and containing interviews with opponents of LGBT rights, intended to expose the lesbian and gay movement's secret plans for America: The Gay Agenda in Public Education (1993), The Gay Agenda: March on Washington (1993), and a feature-length follow-up to the original, Stonewall: 25 Years of Deception (1994).

Usage in the United States
The term "gay agenda" or "radical gay agenda" has been used by members of the Christian right to refer to efforts to change government policies and laws on lesbian, gay, bisexual, and transgender (LGBT) issues, for example, same-sex marriage and civil unions, LGBT adoption, recognizing sexual orientation as a protected civil rights minority classification, LGBT military participation, inclusion of LGBT history and themes in public education, introduction of anti-bullying legislation to protect LGBT minors—as well as non-governmental campaigns and individual actions that increase visibility and cultural acceptance of LGBT people, relationships, and identities. The term has also been used by some social conservatives to describe alleged goals of LGBT rights activists, such as supposed recruitment of heterosexuals into a "homosexual lifestyle".
Columnist James Kirchick writes that the idea of a "homosexual agenda" to subvert American cultural and family institutions largely replaced earlier panic over the "Homintern", an alleged gay conspiracy to undermine the U.S. government.

The term has been used in response to efforts to include protections for LGBT people under local and state anti-discrimination laws, as well as U.S. Supreme Court cases that granted new rights to LGBT individuals, such as Lawrence v. Texas and Obergefell v. Hodges, which respectively held that private acts of consensual sex between same-sex couples and the right of same-sex couples to marry were fundamental rights guaranteed under the Equal Protection Clause of the U.S. Constitution.
In his 2003 dissent in Lawrence, U.S. Supreme Court Justice Antonin Scalia said the court had become embroiled in a culture war by seeking to protect homosexuals from discrimination, writing that the decision reflected a "law-profession culture, that has largely signed on to the so-called homosexual agenda".

Conservative Christian groups such as the Alliance Defending Freedom (ADF), the Catholic Family & Human Rights Institute (C-Fam), and the World Congress of Families (WCF) have used the term in their literature. 
According to its website, ADF has litigated numerous anti–gay rights cases in countries outside the US, in order to combat the "homosexual agenda" which it claims will "destroy marriage and undermine religious freedom". 
ADF president Alan Sears published a book in 2003 titled The Homosexual Agenda: Exposing the Principal Threat to Religious Freedom Today, which argues that overturning anti-sodomy laws would lead to the legalization of pedophilia, incest, polygamy, and bestiality.

In 2004, Oklahoma Senator Tom Coburn called the "gay agenda" the "greatest threat" to Americans' freedoms.
In 2005, James Dobson, director of Focus on the Family, said the goals of the "homosexual activist movement" were:

American conservative Christian groups such as the Family Research Council (FRC) have cited fears of a "homosexual agenda" in lobbying against extending hate-crime legislation to cover acts motivated by bias against a person's sexual orientation or gender identity, 
as well as public-school curricula about homosexuality introduced in an effort to reduce bullying. In 2010, the FRC produced a graphic labelled "Homosexual Agenda" which consisted of the phrases "Innocence", "Family", "Local Community", "Public Health", and "Parental Authority" struck out with red lines.

American conservative Christian organizations have continued public screenings of videos alleging a homosexual agenda as of 2022.

Usage outside the United States

Africa
American Christian right organizations that are losing acceptance among Americans have had more success promoting the notion of a gay agenda in Africa. Examples include Human Life International, American Center for Law & Justice and Family Watch International. Zambian scholar Kapya John Kaoma considers these organizations colonial powers, working to expand American dominance of Africa. In Africa, fear of a "Western gay agenda" is frequently used by opponents of LGBT rights. 

The concept was used in a series of talks in 2009 by American evangelical Christians in Kampala. A speaker at one such workshop said,  feels it is necessary to draft a new law that deals comprehensively with the issue of homosexuality and [...] takes into account the international gay agenda." The eventual result of this campaign was the Anti-Homosexuality Bill of 2009 (nicknamed the "Kill the Gays Bill"), which imposed the death penalty for homosexual behavior; this was altered to life imprisonment after the loss of foreign aid was threatened by other countries including the U.S.

In 2021, the Ghana Catholic Bishops’ Conference called for LGBT rights organizations to be kicked out of their office space in Accra because of the belief that they promote the homosexual agenda.

Europe
In Hungary, László Toroczkai, former vice president of the far-right political party Jobbik, has complained of the perceived "homosexual agenda." 
Toroczkai introduced a law banning public displays of affection by gay people in 2017.

Central America
Before decriminalization of homosexuality in Belize, the LGBT and anti-AIDS organization United Belize Advocacy Movement (UNIBAM) was lambasted in the Amandala newspaper and by American evangelicals who accused the group of trying to bring the "gay 'agenda to the country.

International organizations
In 2019, two prominent Roman Catholic cardinals – Raymond Leo Burke and Walter Brandmuller – wrote an open letter to Pope Francis calling for an end of "the plague of the homosexual agenda" to which they in part attributed the sexual abuse crisis engulfing the Catholic Church. They claimed the agenda was spread by "organized networks" protected by a "conspiracy of silence".

Speakers from many nations inveigh against the perceived homosexual agenda at the World Congress of Families annual summit, a focal point of the worldwide "pro-family" movement.

Responses

The Gay & Lesbian Alliance Against Defamation (GLAAD) describes the terms "gay agenda" and "homosexual agenda" as a "rhetorical invention of anti-gay extremists seeking to create a climate of fear by portraying the pursuit of civil rights for LGBT people as sinister". 

Some writers have described the term as pejorative.
Commentators have remarked on a lack of realism and veracity to the idea of a gay agenda per se. 
Such campaigns based on a presumed "gay agenda" have been described as anti-gay propaganda by researchers and critics.

At a press conference on December 22, 2010, U.S. Representative Barney Frank said that the "gay agenda" is

Satire

A satirical article by Michael Swift which appeared in the Gay Community News in February 1987 entitled "" describes a scenario in which homosexual men dominate American society and suppress all things heterosexual. It was reprinted in Congressional Record without the opening line: "This essay is an outré, madness, a tragic, cruel fantasy, an eruption of inner rage, on how the oppressed desperately dream of being the oppressor".
The article has often been cited by conservative Christian authors as proof of a secretive conspiracy to corrupt American youth and subvert the nuclear family, particularly the paragraph: 

The term is sometimes used satirically as a counterfoil by people who would normally find the term offensive, such as the spoof agenda found on the Betty Bowers website, and as the name of a stand-up comedy show in Prague that is a fundraiser for AIDS relief efforts.

On a 2007 episode of The Daily Show, Jon Stewart defined the gay agenda as "gay marriage, civil rights protection, Fleet Week expanded to Fleet Year, Federal Emergency Management Agency (FEMA) assistance for when it's raining men, Kathy Griffin to host everything and a nationwide ban on pleated pants".

Reappropriation
Some LGBT activists seek to reappropriate the term "gay agenda" for their own use.

In 2008, openly gay Bishop Gene Robinson declared that "Jesus is the agenda, the homosexual agenda in the Episcopal Church" and that the "homosexual agenda [...] is Jesus". 

A political action committee (PAC) named Agenda PAC was inspired by the notion of the gay agenda. The PAC is lead by LGBT politicians including Malcolm Kenyatta and Megan Hunt, and advocates for greater LGBT political representation.
American rapper Lil Nas X thanked the "gay agenda" in his acceptance speech at the 2021 MTV Video Music Awards.

See also

References

Further reading

External links
 Historical text cited by social conservatives as evidence of a "gay agenda"

Political slurs
Homophobia
LGBT rights movement
Political terminology of the United States
Conspiracy theories in the United States
LGBT-related conspiracy theories
Bullying
Discrimination against LGBT people in the United States